Karl Axel Härstedt (born February 28, 1987) is a Swedish discus thrower. A member of the Swedish track and field team at the 2015 IAAF World Championships and at the 2016 Summer Olympics, he launched his personal best throw of 66.03 m at a national track and field meet in Helsingborg nearly a month before the Games. Härstedt currently trains for Malmö Athletics Club.

In 2016 Härstedt won the gold medal in the men's discus throw at the European Throwing Cup held in Arad, Romania.

Härstedt competed for Sweden, along with his fellow countryman Daniel Ståhl, in the men's discus throw at the 2016 Summer Olympics in Rio de Janeiro. Nearly a month before his maiden Games, he successfully nailed the IAAF Olympic entry standard (65.00) by over a single metre with a personal best of 66.03 at a national track and field meet in Helsingborg, a vast improvement from his previous mark of 64.72 set in Jönköping one year earlier. Having unexpectedly entered the final round with his only qualifying throw of 63.58, Härstedt unleashed the discus into the field at an initial distance of 54.77, and then extended it powerfully to 62.12 m on the second round. With his next attempt prompting a foul, Härstedt bowed out of the competition in tenth place.

Competition record

References

External links
 
 SOK Profile 

Swedish male discus throwers
Living people
People from Täby Municipality
1987 births
World Athletics Championships athletes for Sweden
Athletes (track and field) at the 2016 Summer Olympics
Olympic athletes of Sweden
Sportspeople from Stockholm County
21st-century Swedish people